Michal Faško (born 24 August 1994) is a Slovak professional footballer who plays for Slovak top division Dukla Banská Bystrica.

Career

Dukla Banská Bystrica
Faško made his debut for Dukla Banská Bystrica as a 16-year-old, against Spartak Trnava, on 14 May 2011. He replaced Jakub Považanec in the 89th minute. Dukla won the game, at Štadión Antona Malatinského, 0-2.

Personal life
His younger brother Šimon is also footballer, currently playing for FK Železiarne Podbrezová.

References

External links
 
 FK Dukla profile 

Living people
1994 births
Sportspeople from Brezno
Slovak footballers
Slovakia youth international footballers
Slovakia under-21 international footballers
Slovak expatriate footballers
Association football midfielders
FK Dukla Banská Bystrica players
MFK Ružomberok players
Grasshopper Club Zürich players
Eintracht Braunschweig players
MFK Karviná players
FC Nitra players
Slovak Super Liga players
Swiss Super League players
3. Liga players
Czech First League players
Expatriate footballers in Switzerland
Expatriate footballers in Germany
Expatriate footballers in the Czech Republic
Slovak expatriate sportspeople in Switzerland
Slovak expatriate sportspeople in Germany
Slovak expatriate sportspeople in the Czech Republic
FC Slovan Liberec players